RISAT-2, or Radar Imaging Satellite-2 was an Indian radar imaging reconnaissance satellite that was part of India's RISAT programme. It was built by Indian Space Research Organisation (ISRO) and successfully launched aboard a PSLV-CA launch vehicle at 01:15:00 UTC on 20 April 2009 from the Second Launch Pad at the Satish Dhawan Space Centre.

The principal sensor of RISAT-2 was an X-band synthetic-aperture radar (SAR) from Israel Aerospace Industries (IAI). It is designed to monitor India's borders and as part of anti-infiltration and anti-terrorist operations.

History 
RISAT-2 was built at an accelerated pace following the 2008 Mumbai attacks, due to delay with the indigenously developed C-band for RISAT-1. It is India's first dedicated reconnaissance satellite.

The X-band SAR used by RISAT-2 was obtained from Israel in return for launch services for the Israeli TecSAR-1 satellite. The SAR sensor enables RISAT-2 to return images at any time of day and in all weather conditions.

Technical capabilities 
RISAT-2 was India's first satellite with a synthetic-aperture radar (SAR). It possess day-night as well as all-weather monitoring capability. Potential applications include tracking hostile ships at sea that are deemed a military threat to India.

Though ISRO sought to underplay the satellite's defence applications in its announcements, a substantial number of articles concerning RISAT-2 in the Indian media continue to refer to it as a "spy satellite". This is also supported by the fact that its Israeli sensor is clearly pronounced a military grade sensor by its manufacturer Israel Aerospace Industries (IAI).

Launch 
ISRO scientists spent tense hours on 19 April 2009 prior to launch as one of the umbilical cords holding the PSLV-CA launch vehicle to the launch pad fell off, damaging nearly six connectors.

ANUSAT satellite 
The ANUSAT student microsatellite (40 kg) was launched aboard the same launch vehicle as a secondary payload.

Mission 
RISAT-2 was used to search for and eventually locate wreckage of the helicopter crash that claimed the life of Y. S. Rajasekhara Reddy, chief minister of the state of Andhra Pradesh, as well as the lives of his fellow passengers, while traveling over dense jungles in southern India on 2 September 2009.
The satellite reentered over Sumatra on 30 October 2022 at 00:06 UTC after providing payload data for 13 years.

See also 

 Indian military satellites
 List of Indian satellites
 Indo-Israeli relations

References 

2009 in India
Spacecraft launched in 2009
Earth observation satellites of India
Imaging reconnaissance satellites
Synthetic aperture radar satellites
India–Israel relations
Spacecraft which reentered in 2022